Warner Bros. Studios, Burbank, formerly known as First National Studio (1926–1929), Warner Bros.-Seven Arts Studios (1967–1970) and The Burbank Studios (1972–1990), is a major filmmaking facility owned and run by Warner Bros. Entertainment Inc. in Burbank, California. First National Pictures built the  studio lot in 1926 as it expanded from a film distributor to film production.

History 
The financial success of The Jazz Singer and The Singing Fool enabled Warner Bros. to purchase a majority interest in First National in September 1928 and it began moving its productions into the Burbank lot. The First National studio, as it was then known, became the official home of Warner Bros.–First National Pictures with four sound stages. Though Warner's Sunset Boulevard studios remained in active use during the 1930s both for motion picture filming and "phonograph recordings" a fire in December 1934 destroyed  of the studios in Burbank, forcing the company to put its Sunset Boulevard studio back into full use.

In 1937, Stage 7 was raised 30 feet and renamed Stage 16 to become a 98-foot high stage with a 2-million-gallon water tank, one of the largest stages in the world, and has been used to film scenes from The Goonies (1985), The Perfect Storm (2000) and Dunkirk (2017) and is also where Ryan Gosling and Emma Stone's characters can be seen walking in the film La La Land (2016). Stage 22, built in 1937, was the last stage built on the studio lot for 60 years. By 1937, Warner Bros. had all but closed the Sunset studio, making the Burbank lot its main headquarters – which it remains to this day. Eventually Warner dissolved the First National company and the site has often been referred to as simply Warner Bros. Studios since.

The backlot has various sets including New York Street; Hennessy Street; Midwest Street and The Jungle. New York Street was built in 1930 and can be used to represent other cities and has been used for films including 42nd Street (1933), Blade Runner (1982) and The Dark Knight (2008) and television series such as Friends (1994–2004). Hennessy Street was originally known as Tenement Street and was built in 1937. It was used for My Fair Lady (1964), Annie (1982) and Spider-Man (2002). Midwest Street was built in 1939 for Four Wives and has since been used as River City in The Music Man (1962) and for The Dukes of Hazzard (1979-1985) and Gremlins (1984). The Jungle set was built in 1955 for the film Santiago (1956) and has later been used for The Goonies (1985) and The Waltons. In 1955, Warner Bros. Television was created and TV productions on the lot increased with some of the stages subdivided into two or three smaller stages. The Laramie Street set was built in 1957 used for westerns including Blazing Saddles (1974) and TV series Cheyenne and Maverick. In 2004 it was turned into Warner Village, a residential street, used in TV series including Two and a Half Men and The Big Bang Theory.

In a cost-cutting move in 1972, Warner Bros. entered into a joint venture with Columbia Pictures to create, The Burbank Studios on the Warner lot and its auxiliary facility, The Burbank Studios Ranch on Columbia's Columbia Ranch, located a mile north of the main lot. The Burbank Studios was often abbreviated as TBS, especially the ranch, i.e., TBS Ranch. During this period, whether a Columbia Pictures or a Warner Bros. property, a credit for The Burbank Studios being the production base was included within one of each productions' end title cards' credits. Additionally, the new independent supplier Lorimar Productions was based at The Burbank Studios so within the end credits of its properties like The Waltons, The Blue Knight, and Eight Is Enough, a "Filmed at The Burbank Studios" notation was included. The joint venture lasted until 1990 when the partnership was dissolved and Columbia Pictures and sister division Tri-Star Pictures moved into and took over the former Metro-Goldwyn-Mayer/Lorimar (now Sony Pictures Studios) lot in Culver City, with the two studio lots in Burbank reverted to Warner Bros. Studios and Warner Bros. Studios Ranch Facilities, respectively. 

From 1992 to 1995, Columbia TriStar Home Video (now Sony Pictures Home Entertainment) was located on 3400 Riverside Drive at the Warner Bros. lot.

Friends was filmed on the studio lot for ten years. The first season was shot on Stage 5 but at the beginning of the second season, production moved to the larger Stage 24. Stage 24 was renamed "The Friends Stage" after the series finale in 2004. Other shows shot on Stage 24 included Full House and Mike & Molly. The Big Bang Theory was filmed on Stage 25 and Stage 1 which is one of 3 stages where they tape The Ellen DeGeneres Show. By 2015, the studio had 35 sound stages.

Studio tour 

Warner Bros. Studio Tour Hollywood is a public attraction in Warner Bros. Studios, Burbank that offers visitors the chance to glimpse behind the scenes of one of the oldest film studios in the world.

The public tour started in 1973 and was renamed after the success of Warner Bros. Studio Tour London in Leavesden. Previously, it was known as the Warner Bros. Studios VIP Tour.

Studio stages

Main lot

Ranch lot

Museum 

The Warner Bros. Museum opened at the studio in 1996.

Current tenants 
 Warner Bros. Pictures (1926-present)
 Warner Bros. Television Studios (1955-present)
 Warner Bros. Home Entertainment (1979-present)
 Warner Bros. Interactive Entertainment (2004-present)
 The CW (2006-present)
 New Line Cinema (2014-present)

Former tenants 
 Columbia TriStar Home Video (1992-1995)
 The WB (1993-2006)
 Legendary Entertainment (2000-2014)

References

External links 

 Warner Bros. Studios, Burbank website

1926 establishments in California
Buildings and structures completed in 1926
Buildings and structures in Burbank, California
Tourist attractions in Los Angeles County, California
Warner Bros. Studios
Backlot sets